Tecumseh was a notable leader of an alliance of Native American tribes.

Tecumseh may also refer to:

People 
 Napoleon Jackson Tecumseh Dana (1822-1905), U.S. Army general in the American Civil War
 William Tecumseh Sherman
 W. Tecumseh Fitch

Places

Canada
 Mount Tecumseh (Alberta)
 New Tecumseth, Ontario
 Tecumseh, Ontario
 Rural Municipality of Tecumseh No. 65, Saskatchewan

United States
 Tecumseh, Indiana
 Tecumseh, Tippecanoe County, Indiana
 Tecumseh, Kansas
 Tecumseh, Michigan
 Tecumseh, Missouri
 Tecumseh, Nebraska
 Tecumseh, Oklahoma
 Tecumseh Township, Michigan
 Mount Tecumseh, in the White Mountains of New Hampshire

Ships 
 , a US Civil War monitor warship type
 , a ballistic missile submarine 
 , a Canadian Naval Reserve Division
 , a bulk carrier
 , a self-unloading Panamax bulk carrier

Companies 
 Tecumseh Products, a manufacturer of hermetic compressors for air conditioning and refrigeration products

Schools 
 Lafayette Tecumseh Junior High School in Lafayette, Indiana
 Tecumseh Elementary School in Vancouver, Canada
 Tecumseh High School (New Carlisle, Ohio)
 Tecumseh Junior – Senior High School
 Tecumseh Elementary School in Jamesville, New York

Other uses 
 Tecumseh (film), a 1972 film
 Tecumseh (horse)
 Tecumseh Soccer Club, a women's semi-professional soccer team in League1 Ontario

See also 
 Tecumseh's Confederacy
 Tecumseh's Curse
 Tecumseh's War